Clinton Regional Airport  is a city-owned public-use airport located three miles northeast of the central business district of Clinton, a city in Custer County and Washita County, Oklahoma, United States.

Facilities and aircraft 
It has two runways: 17/35 is 4,305 by 75 feet (1,312 x 23 m) with an asphalt surface and 13/31 is 1,348 by 212 feet (411 x 75 m) with a turf surface.

For the 12-month period ending June 21, 2017, the airport had 3,600 aircraft operations, an average of 69 per week: 100% general aviation. At that time there were 17 aircraft based at this airport: 17 single-engine.

References

External links 
 

Airports in Oklahoma